ShopClues is an Indian online marketplace, owned by Clues Network Pvt. Ltd. The company was established in July 2011 by Sanjay Sethi, Sandeep Aggarwal and Radhika Aggarwal. In 2015, ShopClues was valued at US$1.1 billion, with Tiger Global, Helion Ventures, and Nexus Venture Partners as major investors. In 2019, the company was acquired by Singapore-based Qoo10 in an all-stock deal valued at approximately US$70 million, representing one of the largest valuation meltdowns for an Indian-based startup.

Background
ShopClues provides unstructured categories of home and kitchen, fashion, electronics and daily utility items. Around 70% of its Gross Merchandising Value (GMV) is received from Tier – II and Tier – III cities.

In June 2016, the online marketplace reached half a million sellers on its platform, claimed to be the highest in the Indian e-commerce industry. The employee strength as of 2017 is more than 700 people.

Key people
 Sanjay Sethi - Co-Founder and Chief Executive Officer (CEO)
 Sandeep Agarwal - Co-Founder and Chief Operations Officer (COO) 
 Radhika Aggarwal - Co-Founder and Chief Business Officer (CBO)

Mobile application
In 2015, the e-commerce player launched its Android app for sellers, and later added iOS apps.

Growth
In June 2015, ShopClues launched a financing platform Capital Wings to fund its merchants' businesses.
In May 2016, joined hands with GoDaddy to assist its small and medium entrepreneurs in starting their own e-commerce websites.
In July 2016, launched an ad platform, AdZone wherein sellers may market their products with the help of native and custom advertising.

Acquisition
In July 2016, ShopClues collaborated with a hybrid e-commerce company, StoreKing to promote its products on the latter's app. In the same year, the company acquired Momoe, a Bangalore-based mobile payments company.

In 2016 ShopClues acquired the IP of a SaaS platform from Squeakee Media which was founded by Abrar Shaikh in Mumbai, India.

In 2019, ShopClues was acquired by Singapore-based Qoo10 with stock valued at US$70 million.

Investment
In December 2015, the company invested towards seed funding in HeyBiz, which is a real-time shopping assistant app.

Funding
In January 2016, ShopClues raised US$100 million from Tiger Global Management and joined the Unicorn Club.

Controversy
 In August 2015, the owner of the brand Ray-Ban, Luxottica Group accused ShopClues of allegedly selling fake products and took up the issue in court. The Delhi High Court pulled up ShopClues for breaching its earlier order and continuing the sale of Ray-Ban products.
 The site has had a number of complaints both from customers and from other businesses claiming that the site is selling fake products.
 In 2013, founder and CEO Sandeep Agarwal was charged with insider trading and arrested in the US. Agarwal subsequently pleaded guilty and entered a plea bargain on the charges. Agarwal resigned from ShopClues in 2013.

Awards and recognition
 In 2016, received the Gold Award at APAC Effie Awards for Ghar Wapsi campaign in David vs. Goliath category.
 In 2016, won Marketing Campaign of the Year at CMO Asia Awards.
 In 2016, received Award for Consumer Insight at CMO Asia Awards.
 In 2016, became the bronze winner in Film 12B Retail Advertising category for Ghar Wapsi Sale – Bhains Ki Aankh campaign at Abby Awards.
 In 2016, received an award in Search Marketing at 6th India Digital Awards function.
 In 2015, won Silver at Effie India Awards for Ghar Wapsi Campaign.
 In 2015, honored with Advertising Campaign of the Year by Indian e-retail Awards for its TVC, From Ding to Dong.
 In 2015, termed as the Coolest Start-Up in India by Business Today.
 In 2015, received Interactive – Remarketing and Retargeting at DMA Asia ECHO Awards.
 In 2013, featured in Red Herring Asia Top 100 Winners List.
 In 2013, bagged Best e-Commerce Site of the Year award by Global Youth Marketing Format Social Media Summit and Awards.
 In 2013, received the 'Best e-Retailer of the Year – Value for Deals' title by Franchise India at 2ndNational Indian e-Retail Awards.

See also
E-commerce in India
Online Shopping

References

External links
 

Companies based in Gurgaon
Online marketplaces of India
Privately held companies of India
2011 establishments in Haryana
Retail companies established in 2011
Internet properties established in 2011
Indian brands